Joe Marciano (born February 10, 1954) is an American football coach and former player. He was the special teams coordinator for the Detroit Lions from 2015 until his firing in the mid 2018 season.

Coaching career

Tampa Bay Buccaneers
In six seasons with Tampa, 10 players received NFC Special Teams Player of the Week honors under Marciano's tutelage.

Houston Texans
Marciano came to Houston after spending the previous six seasons with the Tampa Bay Buccaneers where he served in the same capacity. The Texans tied three NFL special teams records in 2007 under Marciano, as Houston became the fourth team in NFL history to record four kickoff return touchdowns in a single season. André Davis tied another League record when he returned two kickoffs for touchdowns in one game, becoming only the seventh player in NFL history to do so. Kris Brown became just the third player ever to make three field goals of 50 yards or longer in one game.

Minnesota Vikings
Marciano served as interim special teams coordinator for the Minnesota Vikings while Mike Priefer was out on a three-week suspension in August 2014.

Detroit Lions
On February 17, 2015, Marciano was hired as special teams coordinator for the Detroit Lions. During the 2015 season, Sam Martin posted a then-career-career-high single-season net punting average of 42.0, which ranked fourth in the NFL, while Matt Prater converted 22 of his 24 field goal attempts, including 17 in a row to start the season. Prater's 17 consecutive field goals to start the season marked the longest streak to start a season in Lions history. The Detroit Lions fired Marciano as the special teams coordinator during the mid-season of 2018 on November 5, 2018.

References

1954 births
Living people
American football quarterbacks
East Stroudsburg Warriors football coaches
Houston Texans coaches
New Orleans Saints coaches
Penn State Nittany Lions football coaches
People from Dunmore, Pennsylvania
Rhode Island Rams football coaches
Tampa Bay Buccaneers coaches
Temple Owls football coaches
Temple Owls football players
United States Football League coaches
Players of American football from Pennsylvania